"The Eyes" is the second episode of the second season of the American animated television series Adventure Time. The episode was written and storyboarded by Kent Osborne and Somvilay Xayaphone, from a story by Merriwether Williams, Steve Little, Patrick McHale, Pendleton Ward, and Thurop Van Orman. It originally aired on Cartoon Network on October 18, 2010.

The series follows the adventures of Finn (voiced by Jeremy Shada), a human boy, and his best friend and adoptive brother Jake (voiced by John DiMaggio), a dog with magical powers to change shape and grow and shrink at will. In this episode, Finn and Jake are kept awake by an unsettling horse that does nothing but stare at them with its big eyes. Eventually, after a night of attempting to get the horse to leave them alone, the two discover that it is actually the Ice King (voiced by Tom Kenny) in disguise; he is trying to learn the secret to being happy like Finn and Jake.

Plot

Finn and Jake are kept awake by an unsettling horse that does nothing but stare at them with its big eyes. Eventually, after a night of attempting to get the horse to leave them alone, the two discover that it is actually the Ice King in disguise; he is trying to learn the secret to being happy like Finn and Jake.

Production

The story for "The Eyes" was developed by Merriwether Williams, Steve Little, Patrick McHale, Thurop Van Orman, and series creator Pendleton Ward. Kent Osborne and Somvilay Xayaphone collaborated on the storyboard, which was submitted for network approval April 1, 2010. Larry Leichliter served as the episode's director, Patrick McHale and Cole Sanchez served as its creative directors, and Nick Jennings served as its art director.

The horse disguise that Ice King dons to spy on Finn and Jake was inspired by a fat Shetland pony web comic character, created by Kate Beaton. Beaton was asked by Ward himself if the character could appear in the episode. She later referred to the opportunity as "a pretty great thing".

Reception

"The Eyes" first aired on Cartoon Network on October 18, 2010. The episode was viewed by 2.264 million viewers and scored a Nielsen rating of 1.4/2 percent. This means it was seen by 1.4 percent of all households and 2 percent of all households watching television at the time of the episode's airing. This marked a slight increase in ratings from the season premiere, which had been viewed by 2.001 million viewers. The episode first saw physical release as part of the eponymous 2011 DVD, Adventure Time: My Two Favorite People, which included 12 episodes from the series' first two seasons. It was later re-released as part of the complete second season DVD in June 2013.

Leonard Pierce of The A.V. Club awarded the episode a "B+", and noted that both the episode and the series as a whole were evidence that Cartoon Network was "laying the foundation for fondly remembered animated entertainment that today's kids will be talking about on whatever replaces the internet, 15 years from now." Pierce particularly praised the episode's middle actwhich features Finn and Jake trying desperately to get rid of the horsewriting that the sequence resembles "classic Warner Bros. cartoons of the past" and that the scenes illustrate "that [Adventure Time] works best when it mines the area where absurdism and physical humor meet." Francis Rizzo III of DVD Talk wrote that the episode's premise was "so simple", but that "the way the horse is presented made his every on-screen appearance draw a laugh." Matt Fowler of IGN named the episode a "standout" from the series' second season.

Explanatory notes

References

External links
 

2010 American television episodes
Adventure Time (season 2) episodes